Seix is a commune in the southwestern French department of Ariège.

Population
Inhabitants of Seix are called Seixois.

Sights
 The Château de Mirabat, a Middle Ages castle, known to be in ruins in the 14th century, is in the communes of Seix, Oust and Ustou. Situated on the western end of the ridge of Mirabat, it looks directly over the town, and dominates the three valleys providing approaches to the north or south.  It was once linked to a smaller fortification lower down on the southern slope which was possibly an intermediate 'barracks'.  The castle was commissioned by Charlemagne (Charles Magna, or 'King Charles', of the 'Carol-ingian' dynasty that was to rule France for many years, having deposed the long haired 'Merovingian' dynasty of before) at the turn of the 10th century.  Raiding south into more barbarous lands, he needed to protect his lines of communication and possible retreat, this pass through the mountains being a key link, and possible 'bottleneck'.  It would almost certainly have served as a signal station also.  A previous less informed expedition, returning through the western Pyrenees region, had become strung out on the march and was ransacked and destroyed by the tough mountain inhabitants.  Built (and possibly garrisoned) by the townsfolk, they were thereafter made 'free men' by the King in gratitude for their service.  It was almost certainly a wooden structure in the beginning, being upgraded to stone maybe a century later, as its importance increased entering the Feudal period.  Much of the shape, and a metre or so of the wall, still survives nearly a millennia later.

See also
Communes of the Ariège department

References

Communes of Ariège (department)
Languedoc
Ariège communes articles needing translation from French Wikipedia